The men's javelin throw at the 2017 World Championships in Athletics is being held at the Olympic Stadium on 10 and 12 August.

Summary

Thirteen athletes made the automatic qualifying mark to get into the final.  Five throws into the first round, Johannes Vetter (GER) threw the winner, .  At the end of the round, his teammate Thomas Röhler threw 87.08 m to move into second place.  On the second throw of the second round, Jakub Vadlejch (CZE) threw tantalizingly close to Vetter with an 89.73 m.  Three throws later, Vetter's second throw even bettered that, 89.78 m.  At the end of round, Röhler improved to 88.26 m  Through the next three rounds, nobody could surpass that third best throw, not even the leaders, though Petr Frydrych (CZE) threw 87.93 m twice.  On his final throw, Frydrych threw 88.32m to take the bronze medal.  Both Czech athletes are coached by world record holder Jan Železný.  Both threw personal bests.

Records
Before the competition records were as follows:

No records were set at the competition.

Qualification standard
The standard to qualify automatically for entry was 83.00 metres.

Schedule
The event schedule, in local time (UTC+1), is as follows:

Results

Qualification
The qualification took place on 10 August, in two groups, with Group A starting at 19:03 and Group B at 20:34. Athletes attaining a mark of at least 83.00 metres ( Q ) or at least the 12 best performers ( q ) qualified for the final. The overall results were as follows:

Final
The final took place on 12 August at 20:15. The results were as follows:

References

Javelin throw
Javelin throw at the World Athletics Championships
2017 in men's athletics